The 1991–92 Umaglesi Liga was the third season of top-tier football in Georgia. It began on 15 August 1991 and ended on 20 June 1992. The season was a first under the autumn-spring schedule. Dinamo Tbilisi (changed the name from Iberia Tbilisi in mid-season) were the defending champions.

Locations

League standings

Results

Top goalscorers

See also
1991–92 Pirveli Liga
1991–92 Georgian Cup

References
Georgia - List of final tables (RSSSF)

Erovnuli Liga seasons
1
Georgia